Brendan Myers Miller is a Canadian lawyer based in Calgary who has worked on criminal and civil cases. His clients include the Blood Tribe First Nation, former National Hockey League player Theo Fleury, Alberta Minister Ric McIver, former Alberta Minister of Justice Jonathan Denis and Canada convoy protesters.

During the Public Order Emergency Commission, Miller forced the government of Canada to resubmit unredacted copies of their evidence. His statements linking an Enterprise Canada employee with a Nazi flag at the protest provoked criticism from the Toronto Star and the commissioner.

Career 
Miller is a Calgary based criminal defence and constitutional lawyer, and general litigator  who is Special Counsel at Foster LLP. His notable clients include the Blood Tribe First Nation, former NHL star Theo Fleury, Alberta Minister Ric McIver, and former Alberta Minister of Justice Jonathan Denis.

In 2013, Miller successfully argued the United Nations Convention on the Rights of Persons with Disabilities in order to keep his client, convicted of sexual assault, out of jail, though this later overturned by the Appeal Court, and substituted with a sentence of 90 days in jail to be served on weekends, plus one year of probation. In 2013 and 2014 he was part of the legal team representing Heather Wilson Duncan who was acquitted of second degree murder in shooting death of her husband, but convicted of manslaughter and receiving a four year sentence.

In 2015, he provided pro bono legal services to a couple who sought to keep their daughter on life support. In 2017, Miller constitutionally challenged on behalf of a client the inability for persons accused with securities fraud to have a jury trial, and argued the same before the Supreme Court of Canada.

In 2018, Miller was counsel to Ric McIver in a dispute with the Alberta Conflicts of Interest Commissioner, regarding whether the Commissioner's report and decision was subject to judicial review. The Court ruled that the Commissioner's report and decision were subject to parliamentary privilege, and therefore immune from review by the Courts. Also in 2018, Daniel Colborne and Miller were successful in challenging the prohibition of common law unmarried couples in dividing their pensions upon separation in Alberta, with the Court finding the legislation violated equality rights in s.15 of the Canadian Charter of Rights and Freedoms.

In 2021 Miller acted for former NHL star, Theo Fleury, in a dispute over the ownership of the rights to Fleury's life story. That same year, Miller lead a coalition of Canadian lawyers seeking the prosecutor of International Criminal Court, Karim Khan, open a preliminary investigation on the Government of Canada and the Vatican for crimes against humanity over their involvement in the mass grave site discovered in Kamloops. Khan declined the request, on the basis that the crime had not occurred on or after July 1, 2002. Miller and other lawyers maintained that the federal government and the Vatican suppressed their alleged crimes beyond 2002, amounting to a continuing offence. Khan didn't address the argument in their rejection.

In Spring 2022, Miller defended former Alberta Minister of Justice, Jonathan Denis, in contempt proceedings. On appeal, Professor Peter Sankoff K.C. as lead appeal counsel, and Miller, acted for Denis where the Alberta Court of Appeal quashed the conviction for contempt.

In 2022, Miller represented some of the Canada convoy protestors at the Public Order Emergency Commission. During the commission, Miller succeeded in forcing the government of Canada to resubmit unredacted copies of 20 documents to the inquiry. His application at the commission to have a man testify that an Enterprise Canada employee was identified as the man carrying a Nazi flag at the Ottawa protests in a sworn affidavit filed with the commission, and Miller's cross-examinations, caused Politico to label Miller as the "Biggest Firebrand of 2022". The Toronto Star labeled the claim a "baseless conspiracy theory". Justice Paul Rouleau who ran the commission described the claim as having “little foundation in evidence.” In January 2023, local roofer Maurice Landriault told CTV News that he took the Confederate flag to the protest and that he informed Miller of this during the commission. Miller was later removed from the commission after arguing with and talking over Justice Rouleau regarding redacted records, outstanding motions, and calling of witnesses, but was let back in that day.

Public relations company Enterprise Canada launched a legal claim for damages in the Ontario Superior Court of Justice on December 20, 2022, stating that Miller's claims that their employee took the Nazi flag to the protest were false. Enterprise Canada previously served a defamation notice on Miller in November 2022.

Miller has taught at Mount Royal University and University of Calgary Law School.

Personal life 
Miller is married with a daughter.

References 

Living people
1980s births
Canada convoy protest
People from Alberta
21st-century Canadian lawyers
Criminal defense lawyers
Academic staff of Mount Royal University
Academic staff of the University of Calgary